Redcliffe Musical Theatre (RMT) is a community theatre company in Redcliffe City, Queensland, Australia.

History
Redcliffe Musical Theatre was founded in 2009. It "provide[s] affordable performance opportunities and training for actors, singers, dancers, directors and technicians; with a key focus on young people".

Shows 
 The Sound of Music, August 2010
 Joseph and the Amazing Technicolor Dreamcoat, April 2011
 Oliver!, August 2011
 Singin' in the Rain, April 2012
 The Pirates of Penzance, August 2012
 Grease, August 2012
 Little Shop of Horrors, July 2013
 The Phantom of the Opera, December 2013
 Jesus Christ Superstar, April 2014
 The Wizard of Oz, July and August 2014
 Saturday Night Fever, March and April 2015
 Mary Poppins, March 2016
 Wicked, to be presented July and August 2016

Divisions and affiliates

RMT Youth 
RMT Youth productions call for staff and performers in the 14 to 20 age bracket. The following productions are under the RMT Youth banner:
 Grease, June 2015
 Beauty and the Beast, to be presented June 2016

Roar Academy 
Roar Academy is a sister institution of RMT, providing acting, singing and dancing training to students aged from 5 to 18 years. It also functions as a student theatre company in its own right, and has staged productions of Oklahoma, Robinson Crusoe, The Pirates of Penzance, The Wizard of Oz Pantomime and Into the Woods Jr.

Committee
The current Redcliffe Musical Theatre committee, as at February 2016, consists of:
 Madeleine Johns, president;
 Ingrid Keegel, treasurer;
 Jonathan Johns, secretary;
 Bruce Noy, technical director;
 Lucas Lynch, youth division representative;
 Richard Rubendra;
 Charlene Kirkpatrick.

References

External links
 Redcliffe Musical Theatre website
 ROAR Performing Arts Academy website

Amateur theatre companies in Australia
Companies based in Queensland